The 1929 Cal Aggies football team represented the Northern Branch of the College of Agriculture—now known as the University of California, Davis—as a member of the Far Western Conference (FWC) during the 1929 college football season. Led by second-year head coach Crip Toomey, the Aggies compiled an overall record of 6–2 with a mark of 5–0 in conference play, winning the FWC title. The team outscored its opponents 116 to 25 for the season with all six of their victories coming via shutout. The Cal Aggies played home games at Sacramento Stadium in Sacramento, California.

Kermit Schmidt, who played for the Cal Aggies from 1926 to 1929 and was the team's captain in 1929, later played in the National Football League (NFL) for the Boston Braves and Cincinnati Reds. Schmidt was the first Cal Aggie to play in the NFL. Following Schmidt, no other Aggie played in the NFL until Tom Williams in 1970.

Schedule

Notes

References

Cal Aggies
UC Davis Aggies football seasons
Northern California Athletic Conference football champion seasons
Cal Aggies football